Palinyewah (also known as Ellerslie) is a locality in New South Wales, Australia, located approximately 47 km north-east of Wentworth, New South Wales. The area is largely devoted to citrus fruit production.

The Palinyewah Public School opened in May, 1954, starting out in a small shed on a nearby farm.

References

External links 

Towns in New South Wales
Populated places on the Darling River
Wentworth Shire